Overveen is a railway station in Overveen, Netherlands. The station opened 3 June 1881. It lies on the Haarlem–Zandvoort railway. The station has two platforms on a central island. It is located along the Tetterodeweg.

Old names 
Until 1 January 1900 the name was Overveen-Bloemendaal.

Train services 
As of 9 December 2018, the following services call at Overveen:

National Rail

Bus services

References

External links 
 NS website 
 Dutch Public Transport journey planner 

Railway stations in North Holland
Railway stations opened in 1881
Bloemendaal
1881 establishments in the Netherlands
Railway stations in the Netherlands opened in the 19th century